Madison Siegrist (born May 22, 2000) is an American college basketball player for the Villanova Wildcats of the Big East Conference. She is the Big East's all-time leading scorer in Women's Basketball.

Early life and high school career
Siegrist played basketball for Our Lady of Lourdes High School in Poughkeepsie, New York. As a junior, she was named Poughkeepsie Journal Player of the Year after averaging 21 points, 12 rebounds and four assists per game and leading her team to the Section 1 Class AA semifinals. In her senior season, Siegrist averaged 32.7 points and 13.1 rebounds per game and repeated as Poughkeepsie Journal Player of the Year. She committed to playing college basketball for Villanova.

College career
Siegrist redshirted her first season at Villanova after suffering a broken ankle. On December 21, 2019, she posted 41 points and 10 rebounds in a 77–69 win over La Salle, breaking the program freshman single-game scoring record. As a freshman, she averaged 18.8 points and 8.9 rebounds per game, earning first-team All-Big East and Freshman of the Year honors. Siegrist scored 583 points in the season, the most ever by a Villanova freshman. On December 19, 2020, she had a sophomore season-high 34 points and 19 rebounds in a 73–68 victory over Creighton. Siegrist averaged 22.8 points and 9.8 rebounds per game as a sophomore, and was a unanimous first-team All-Big East selection. 

On February 11, 2022, she scored a junior season-high 42 points, one short of the Big East record, and grabbed 13 rebounds in a 74–63 overtime win against Marquette. As a junior, Siegrist averaged 25.3 points and 9.2 rebounds per game, leading the Big East and ranking second in the NCAA Division I in scoring. She was named Big East Player of the Year and earned unanimous first-team All-Big East honors. Siegrist was a third-team All-American selection by the Associated Press and the United States Basketball Writers Association. 

On January 20, 2023, she surpassed Shelly Pennefather for Villanova's career scoring record while scoring 23 points in a 73–57 win over Creighton. On February 11, Siegrist posted a career-high 50 points and 10 rebounds in a 99–65 win over Seton Hall. She broke the Big East and Villanova single-game scoring records and became the Big East's all-time leading scorer. As a senior, she was the nation’s leading scorer, averaging 29.0 points and 9.1 rebounds per game. She recorded 13 games of at least 30 points, and scored no less than 21 points in a game this year. She became the Big East's all-time leading scorer, men’s or women’s, with 1,693 points. Following an outstanding season, she was named Big East Player of the Year and earned unanimous first-team All-Big East honors.

Personal life
Siegrist's father, George, played college basketball for Marist before joining the team as an assistant coach. At Villanova University, she received a bachelor's degree in communications and is pursuing a master's degree in education.

References

External links
Villanova Wildcats bio

2000 births
Living people
American women's basketball players
Small forwards
Power forwards (basketball)
Villanova Wildcats women's basketball players
Basketball players from New York (state)
Sportspeople from Poughkeepsie, New York
All-American college women's basketball players